WYSJ-CD (channel 19) is a low-power, Class A television station licensed to Yorktown, Virginia, United States, owned by Jacobs Broadcasting System, Inc. After a change of management, the station completed digital conversion in July 2015 and discontinued analog broadcasting. Since December 2015, it has been broadcasting a classic TV format. It was formerly a ShopHQ and Gospel Broadcasting Network affiliate. A nearby JBS-owned station, WJHJ-LP (channel 39), formerly rebroadcast WYSJ-CA but is now affiliated with The Walk TV.

Subchannel

References

External links

YSJ-CD
Television channels and stations established in 1999
Low-power television stations in the United States
1999 establishments in Virginia
York County, Virginia